"Save Us Tonight" is Park Jung-min's first original Japanese single. There are three editions of the single: the limited edition A, the limited edition B and the normal edition, as well as the Korean Edition.

Track listing

Music videos
Save Us Tonight

References

External links
 
 

SS501 songs
2014 songs
Japanese-language songs
Songs written by Park Jung-min (singer)